Jordi Nadal (14 March 1929 – 8 December 2020) was a Spanish economist and historian. He earned a doctorate in history from the University of Barcelona and became a professor at the University of Valencia and Pompeu Fabra University.

Publications
El fracaso de la revolución industrial en España (1975)
Moler, tejer y fundir (1992)
Atlas de la industrialización de España (1994)

Distinctions
Premis Narcís Monturiol (1983)
Creu de Sant Jordi (1997)
Premio Nacional de Investigación Pascual Madoz (2004)
Doctor honoris causa of Pompeu Fabra University

References

1929 births
2020 deaths
People from Gironès
Spanish economists
20th-century Spanish historians
University of Barcelona alumni
Academic staff of the University of Valencia
Academic staff of Pompeu Fabra University